César-Jean Ruminski (13 June 1924 − 14 May 2009) was a French football goalkeeper. He was of Polish descent.

References

External links
 
 

1924 births
French people of Polish descent
French footballers
France international footballers
Association football goalkeepers
Ligue 1 players
Ligue 2 players
Stade de Reims players
Le Havre AC players
Lille OSC players
1954 FIFA World Cup players
2009 deaths
People from Douai
SC Douai players
Sportspeople from Nord (French department)
Footballers from Hauts-de-France